Kila Kila Kila is the fourth studio album from the Japanese rock band OOIOO, originally released in 2003 in Japan. It was later released in America on February 17, 2004, the band's first album released on Thrill Jockey.

Track listing

Personnel

 Yoshimi - Vocals,  Electric Guitar
 Organ on "Kila Kila Kila" and "Niko Niko Niko"
 Fender Rhodes on "Sizuku Ring Neng"
 Trumpet on "On Mani"
 Kaoss Pad Hamming on "Northern Lights"
 Piano on "Anuenue"
 Percussion on "Ene Soda", "Sizuku Ring Neng" and "Northern Light"
 Kayan - Electric Guitar, Backing Vocals
 Aya - Bass, Backing Vocals
 Yuka Yoshimura - Drums, Backing Vocals (of Catsuomaticdeath, Metalchicks, ex. DMBQ, ex. OOIOO, ex. Hydro-Guru)

Guest performers

 Tatekawa Yo2ro - Drums, Cowbell on "Northern Lights"
 Sun Tour - Sampler on "Nico Nico Nico"
 Hatano Atuko - Cello on "On Mani" and "Aster", Violin on "On Mani"
 Moriya Takumin - Double Bass on "Kila Kila Kila", "On Mani" and "Aster"

Technical personnel

 Yoshimi - Production, Mixing
 Hara Koichi - Mixing, Engineering
 Koizumi - Mastering
 Goto Shoji - Artwork
 Tominaga Yoshie - Photography

Releases information

References

OOIOO albums
Thrill Jockey albums
2003 albums